John Clifford may refer to:

John Clifford, 7th Baron de Clifford (1389–1422), also 7th Lord of Skipton
John Clifford, 9th Baron de Clifford (1435–1461), also 9th Lord of Skipton, Lancastrian military leader during the Wars of the Roses
John David Clifford, Jr. (1887–1956), United States District Judge for the District of Maine
John H. Clifford (1809–1876), Governor of Massachusetts
John Clifford (minister) (1836–1923), British nonconformist minister and politician
J. R. Clifford or John Robert Clifford (1848–1933), West Virginian African-American attorney
John R. Clifford, USDA Chief Veterinarian
John Clifford (choreographer)
Johnny Clifford, Irish hurler